Manuel Jesús Plaza Reyes (17 March 1900 – 9 February 1969) was a long-distance runner from Chile. He competed in the marathon at the 1924 and 1928 Olympics and won a silver medal in 1928, becoming the first Olympic medalist from Chile. He placed sixth in 1924, and served as the flag bearer for Chile at both Olympics.

References

1900 births
1969 deaths
Chilean male long-distance runners
Olympic athletes of Chile
Athletes (track and field) at the 1924 Summer Olympics
Athletes (track and field) at the 1928 Summer Olympics
Olympic silver medalists for Chile
Chilean male marathon runners
Medalists at the 1928 Summer Olympics
Olympic silver medalists in athletics (track and field)
People from Maipo Province